The following is the list of episodes of the Japanese anime Telepathy Shōjo Ran produced by TMS Entertainment. The anime is the 2008 adaptation of the novel Telepathy Shōjo Ran Jiken Note. The anime has run on Saturdays since June 21, except for a break on August 9. It is expected to run for a total of 26 episodes until December.  The anime features an opening theme song  by Chara, and an ending theme song  by Onso9line (pronounced: "onsoku line").

Episode list

References

External links
NHK anime website 

Telepathy Shojo Ran